Skylar Astin Lipstein (born September 23, 1987) is an American actor and singer. He became known for portraying Jesse Swanson in the musical films Pitch Perfect (2012) and Pitch Perfect 2 (2015). He originated the role of Georg in the Broadway musical Spring Awakening, and has since appeared in films such as Hamlet 2 (2008), Taking Woodstock (2009), Cavemen (2013), and 21 & Over (2013). He played the role of Greg Serrano on the last season of Crazy Ex-Girlfriend, a role originally played by Santino Fontana, and Max in the musical dramedy Zoey's Extraordinary Playlist (2020). He plays the titular role in the 2022 CBS drama So Help Me Todd.

Early life
Astin was born in New York City, the son of Meryl and Barry Lipstein, a garment industry executive. He grew up in New City, New York, in Rockland County. He has a sister, Brielle, and two brothers, Milan and Jace. Astin is Jewish. Having graduated from Clarkstown High School North, he attended Stagedoor Manor performing arts summer camp. He was also a student at the Tisch School of the Arts at New York University, but he took a leave of absence when cast in Spring Awakening. Lipstein says that when he was 15, his agent suggested he use his middle name, Astin, instead of his surname as his stage last name to be "less specific to one thing" and that he is not embarrassed or ashamed of his decision.

Career
Astin's first professional role was a minor role in the original Off-Broadway and Broadway cast of Spring Awakening as Georg, a male student with a crush on his piano teacher. He had short solos in multiple songs, but the character is noted for his belting in the song "Touch Me". During his run as Georg, Astin filmed the role Rand Posin in the film Hamlet 2. He sang "Raped in the Face" on the soundtrack with Phoebe Strole, a Spring Awakening castmate, and his co-star in the film, and the film's star, Steve Coogan. Screenings of the film at the 2008 Sundance Film Festival led to Astin signing on with United Talent Agency.

Astin joined the cast of the 2009 Adam Carolla sitcom Ace in the Hole on CBS. However, the show was not picked up by the network.

In 2010, Astin took on the role of Mark Cohen in a production of Rent, directed by Neil Patrick Harris, at the Hollywood Bowl. The cast included Aaron Tveit and Vanessa Hudgens. Also in 2010, he joined the cast of the Jere Burns sitcom Strange Brew on Fox, which like Ace in the Hole was not picked up.

Astin guest-starred as Ben in the July 2011 episode of Love Bites titled "Boys to Men" and, as Matt Kornstein, in the May 2012 episode of Girls entitled "Hannah's Diary". He also played a patient on House in season 8, episode 21 in May 2012.

In 2012, Astin found his breakthrough starring in the comedy film Pitch Perfect (2012), as Jesse Swanson, and reprised the role in the 2015 sequel Pitch Perfect 2. Astin also starred in the comedy film 21 and Over (2013) as Casey.

Astin also starred in the TBS sitcom Ground Floor as Brody Moyer, a young ambitious money manager who falls for a girl on the ground floor. He also led an NBA comedy pilot on ABC. 

In 2019, Astin played the Baker in the Hollywood Bowl production of Into the Woods.

He starred in the musical dramedy Zoey's Extraordinary Playlist as Zoey's best friend Max. In March 2022, it was announced that he would have a recurring role in the eighteenth season of the ABC medical drama Grey's Anatomy as Todd Eames.

Personal life
In 2006, Astin began dating Lauren Pritchard. He then began dating Pitch Perfect co-star Anna Camp in 2013. The couple were reported to be engaged in January 2016. They married on September 10, 2016. On April 19, 2019, the couple announced that they were filing for divorce. In late August 2019, the divorce was finalized.

In January, 2023, Astin's home in Los Angeles was broken into by burglars who ransacked the place.  Astin was away from home when the robbery occurred.

Discography

Singles

Filmography

Film

Television

Web

Stage

References

External links
 
 

1987 births
Living people
21st-century American male actors
American male film actors
American male musical theatre actors
American male stage actors
American male voice actors
American male television actors
Jewish American male actors
Male actors from New York City
People from Rockland County, New York
Tisch School of the Arts alumni